The Balleny Islands are a series of uninhabited islands in the Southern Ocean extending from 66°15' to 67°35'S and 162°30' to 165°00'E. The group extends for about  in a northwest-southeast direction. The islands are heavily glaciated and of volcanic origin. Glaciers project from their slopes into the sea. The islands were formed by the so-called Balleny hotspot.

The group includes three main islands: Young, Buckle and Sturge, which lie in a line from northwest to southeast, and several smaller islets and rocks:
northeast of Young Island: Seal Rocks, Pillar
southeast of Young Island: Row Island, Borradaile Island (with Swan Base shelter hut)
south of Buckle Island: Scott Cone, Chinstrap Islet, Sabrina Islet (with Sabrina Refuge shelter hut), and the Monolith

The islands are claimed by New Zealand as part of the Ross Dependency (see Territorial claims in Antarctica).

Islands and rocks from north to south 

The Antarctic Circle is close to Borradaile Island, in the eight-kilometre channel between Young and Buckle Islands. Buckle Island and the nearby Sabrina Island is home to several colonies of Adelie and chinstrap penguins.

Recorded human visits to the islands 
The English sealing captains John Balleny and Thomas Freeman first sighted the group in 1839. Balleny named the island group after himself and the individual islands after the London merchants whose financial backing had made the expedition possible. Freeman was the first person to land on any of the islands on 9 February 1839, and this was the first human landfall south of the Antarctic Circle. 

Sealers sighted the islands in 1853 but did not land.

In February 2015 the islands were visited for three days by the New Zealand-Australia Antarctic Ecosystems Voyage under the auspices of the New Zealand National Institute of Water and Atmospheric Research aboard the vessel RV Tangaroa, with the objective of studying marine life ecosystems of the islands, especially with reference to the humpback whale. This work followed up work done on a previous visit in 2010.

On 3 February 2017, personnel from the Swiss Polar Institute's Antarctic Circumnavigation Expedition visited the islands and carried out considerable photographic and video survey work which was intended to contribute to the first accurate mapping of the main islands. Most of the work was done by helicopter, although at least one landfall was also made on the islands by this expedition, using Zodiac inflatable boats.

Geology 
In the archipelago, the Buckle, Sturge and Young Islands are examples of stratovolcanoes. Strong earthquakes very close to the islands are rare, but tremors of moderate strength do occur over the Pacific-Antarctic Ridge, Macquarie Triple Junction and Pacific Rim between the Balleny Islands and Macquarie Island.

It is possible that these islands are still volcanically active. The Brown Peak volcano may have had an eruption in 2001, based on satellite observation.

Submerged features 
Several underwater features lie close to the Balleny Islands:
 Balleny Seamounts
 Balleny Trough
 Umitaka Bank
 Vaughan Bank

See also

 Cape Frances
 Composite Gazetteer of Antarctica
 Territorial claims in Antarctica
 Scientific Committee on Antarctic Research
 List of Antarctic islands south of 60° S
 List of islands
 Desert island

References

External links

 
Volcanoes of the Southern Ocean
Hotspot volcanoes
Archipelagoes of New Zealand
Archipelagoes of the Southern Ocean
Volcanic islands